
Rawicz County is a unit of territorial administration and local government (powiat) in Greater Poland Voivodeship, west-central Poland. It came into being on January 1, 1999, as a result of the Polish local government reforms passed in 1998.

As of 2006 its total population is 59,375, out of which the population of Rawicz is 21,301, that of Miejska Górka is 3,128, that of Bojanowo is 3,014, that of Jutrosin is 1,872, and the rural population is 30,060.

Neighbouring counties
Rawicz County is bordered by Gostyń County to the north, Krotoszyn County and Milicz County to the east, Trzebnica County to the south, Góra County to the west, and Leszno County to the north-west.

Administrative division
The county is subdivided into five gminas (four urban-rural and one rural). These are listed in the following table, in descending order of population.

References
Polish official population figures 2006

 
Rawicz